Orthopichonia is a genus of plants in the family Apocynaceae, first described as a genus in 1953. It was initially given the name Orthandra, but this turned out to be an illegitimate homonym (in other words, the same name had already been used for a different plant). Orthopichonia is native to  Africa.

Species
 Orthopichonia barteri (Stapf) H.Huber - Ivory Coast, Nigeria, Cameroon, Gabon, Central African Republic, Republic of Congo, Zaire 
 Orthopichonia cirrhosa (Radlk.) H.Huber - Nigeria, Cameroon, Gabon, Central African Republic, Republic of Congo, Zaire, Angolan Province of Cabinda
 Orthopichonia indeniensis (A.Chev.) H.Huber - Ivory Coast, Nigeria, Liberia, Cameroon 
 Orthopichonia schweinfurthii (Stapf) H.Huber - Cameroon, Central African Republic, Republic of Congo, Zaire, South Sudan
 Orthopichonia seretii (De Wild.) Vonk - Cameroon, Gabon, Central African Republic, Zaire 
 Orthopichonia visciflua (K.Schum. ex Hallier f.) Vonk - Cameroon, Gabon

References

Apocynaceae genera
Rauvolfioideae